Group E of UEFA Euro 2016 contained Belgium, Italy, Republic of Ireland and Sweden. Italy was the only former European champion in this group, having won in 1968. Matches were played from 13 to 22 June 2016.

Teams

Notes

Standings

In the round of 16,
The winner of Group E, Italy, advanced to play the runner-up of Group D, Spain.
The runner-up of Group E, Belgium, advanced to play the winner of Group F, Hungary.
The third-placed team of Group E, Republic of Ireland, advanced as one of the four best third-placed teams to play the winner of Group A, France.

Matches

Republic of Ireland vs Sweden

Belgium vs Italy

Italy vs Sweden

Belgium vs Republic of Ireland

Italy vs Republic of Ireland

Sweden vs Belgium

References

External links
UEFA Euro 2016 Group E

UEFA Euro 2016
Belgium at UEFA Euro 2016
Italy at UEFA Euro 2016
Sweden at UEFA Euro 2016
Republic of Ireland at UEFA Euro 2016